Oscar Fredrik Andrén (7 November 1899 – 11 September 1981) was a Swedish boxer who competed in the 1924 Summer Olympics. In 1924 he finished fourth in the bantamweight class after losing the bronze medal bout to Jean Ces.

References

External links
profile

1899 births
1981 deaths
Sportspeople from Stockholm
Bantamweight boxers
Olympic boxers of Sweden
Boxers at the 1924 Summer Olympics
Swedish male boxers
20th-century Swedish people
Djurgårdens IF boxers